Michael Baska (born 17 November 1994) is a United States rugby union player, currently playing for the Utah Warriors of Major League Rugby (MLR) and the United States national team. His preferred position is scrum-half.

Professional career
Baska signed for Major League Rugby side Utah Warriors for the 2021 Major League Rugby season, having also played for the side in 2020, and played for the New Orleans Gold in 2018 and 2019. 

Baska debuted for United States against England during the 2021 July rugby union tests.

References

External links
itsrugby.co.uk Profile

1994 births
Living people
United States international rugby union players
Rugby union scrum-halves
American rugby union players
New Orleans Gold players
Utah Warriors players
Rouen Normandie Rugby players
Chicago Hounds (rugby union) players